Dzongkhul Monastery or Zongkhul Gompa is located in the Stod Valley of Zanskar in Ladakh, northern India. Like the Sani Monastery, it belongs to the Drukpa school of Tibetan Buddhism

Dzongkhul has traditionally been home to famous yogins. It is sited near the foot of a wide valley which leads to the pass known as the Umasi-la which joins Zanskar and Kishtwar.

History
Its foundation is attributed to Naropa (956-1041 CE), who was a celebrated Indian Buddhist yogi, mystic and monk from the renowned Vikramshila University in Bihar. He is said to have meditated in one of the two caves around which the gompa is built and the monastery is dedicated to him. His footprint can be seen in the rock near the entrance to the lower cave. The gompa contains images and thankas of famous Drukpa lamas. Zhadpa Dorje, a famous painter and scholar created some of the frescoes on the cave walls almost 300 years ago.

Impressions of Naropa's ceremonial dagger and staff are also said to be in the rocks in his meditation cave which attracts many pilgrims. Until about the 1960s, there were some 20 resident monks, but the numbers have subsequently dropped.

It also contains a collection of religious artifacts, such as an ivory image of Samvara, a crystal stupa, and texts containing spiritual songs and biographies.

Dzongkhul became a flourishing Kagyu meditation centre under the Zanskari yogi Ngawang Tsering (1717-1794).

Description
Dzongkhul is in a south-western side valley of the Bardur River. It is built directly on a rock wall with two caves behind. In front are about 10 stone houses which tend to blend in with the surrounding rocks from a distance. About 10 minutes' walk from the gompa is a high viewing spot similar to the one at Hemis Monastery with views from the terrace.

Festivals
The Zongkhul Huchot festival on the 16th and 17th days of the fourth Tibetan month but there are no masked dances.

Footnotes

References
 Bhasin, Sanjeev Kumar. (2008). Amazing land Ladakh: places, people, and culture. Indus Publishing Company. .
 Gutschow, Kim (2004). Being a Buddhist Nun: The Struggle for Enlightenment in the Himalayas. Harvard University Press. ISBN
978-0674012875.
 Rizvi, Janet. 1998. Ladakh, Crossroads of High Asia. Oxford University Press. 1st edition 1963. 2nd revised edition 1996. 3rd impression 2001. .
 Schettler, Margaret & Rolf (1981). Kashmir, Ladakh & Zanskar. Lonely Planet Publications. South Yarra, Victoria, Australia. .

External links
 Zongkul Monastery

Drukpa Kagyu monasteries and temples
Buddhist monasteries in Ladakh
Religious organizations established in the 11th century
Buddhist caves in India
Tibetan Buddhist monasteries and temples in India
11th-century establishments in India